İsmail Beşikçi (born 1939 in İskilip, Turkey) is a Turkish sociologist, philosopher, revolutionist, and writer. He is a PEN Honorary Member. He has served 17 years in prison on propaganda charges stemming from his writings about the Kurdish population in Middle East.

Early life and education 
Beşikçi studied at the Faculty of Political Sciences of Ankara University, and graduated in 1962. After his military duty he became an assistant professor at Atatürk University in Erzurum. He prepared his first anthropological study, an investigation of one of the last nomadic Kurdish tribes, the Alikan, here, which he submitted in 1967 to the Ankara Faculty of Political Sciences. His second encounter with the Kurds was during his military service when he served in Bitlis and Hakkâri where he first saw the nomadic Alikan tribe pass through Bitlis on their migrations from winter to summer meadows and back.

Professional career 
His book "The order of East Anatolia", first published in 1969, in which he sought to adapt and apply Marxist concepts to the analysis of Kurdish society and to the processes of socio-economic and political change taking place, made him a public enemy. While the book did not cause much debate either in academic or left intellectual circles, the university took disciplinary measures against him which would lead to a trial after the 1971 coup. He was detained and put on trial for communist and anti-national propaganda where he was sentenced to 13 years imprisonment for violating the indivisibility of the Turkish nation. Beşikçi did not have to serve his full 13 years and benefited amnesty in late 1974. He unsuccessfully applied for a position at the Faculty of Political Sciences in Ankara, which in 1970 had appeared willing to employ him. He never found academic employment again and was henceforth working to do his research as an independent scholar in economically precarious circumstances.

On Kurds 
For many years, Ismail Beşikçi was the only non-Kurdish person in Turkey to speak out loud and clearly in defense of the rights of the Kurds. Continuing to write and speak in spite of all attempts to silence him, Beşikçi has become a powerful and important symbol for the Kurds and for the human rights movement of Turkey.  He has been described as "modern Turkey's pioneer of Kurdish studies".

Ismail Besikci has authored several important works on Kurdish social organization and the continuing plight of Kurds today. His most famous work is International Colony Kurdistan. Besikci argues that the Turkish state has been practicing a policy of genocide against Kurds over the past 80 years. International Colony Kurdistan is probably Besikci's most open critique of the present division of Kurdistan, an ethnically contagious area (mainly) between Turkey, Iran and Iraq - with a Kurdish population of several million people. Besikci argues that, for all their political differences, there is a longstanding understanding between these regional states to deny Kurds the right of self-determination and nationhood. Ismail Besikci's International Colony Kurdistan was originally published in 1991 and led to the imprisonment of the author in Turkey. The book remains a roadmap for our understanding of Kurdistan today.

On the Kurdistan Workers' Party 
He is a prominent criticizer of Abdullah Öcalan, the leader of the Kurdistan Workers' Party (PKK), who doesn't support the creation of an independent Kurdistan. In 2010 he was again prosecuted, this time by the attorney general of Istanbul for “PKK propaganda” on account of an article on "The rights of the nations to self-determination and the Kurds" that he wrote for the "Association of Contemporary Lawyers".

Imprisonment 
He was charged for over 100 years but released from jail in 1999. In March 2011 he was sentenced to 15 months in prison.

Recognition 

 1987 candidate for the Nobel Peace Prize.
 2012 Hrant Dink award of the Hrant Dink Foundation for his research on Kurds and republican era in Turkey
 2014 Person of the Year of Rudaw Media Network for his contribution to the Kurdish cause.

Publications 
32 of the 36 books that he has published have been banned in Turkey. Here a selection of his books

 Kürdler ve Gelecegini Belirleme Hakki
 Dewlet Û Kurd
 Bilim Yöntemi Türkiye'deki Uygulama-IV - Tunceli Kanunu (1935) ve Dersim Jenosidi

References

External links

1939 births
Kurdologists
Living people
People from İskilip
Turkish Marxists
Turkish non-fiction writers
Turkish philosophers
Turkish revolutionaries
Turkish scientists
Turkish socialists
Turkish sociologists
Turkish prisoners and detainees